Uralsk is the name of several rural localities in Russia:
Uralsk, Republic of Bashkortostan, a selo in Uralsky Selsoviet of Uchalinsky District of the Republic of Bashkortostan
Uralsk, Orenburg Oblast, a selo in Iriklinsky Settlement Council of Gaysky District of Orenburg Oblast

See also
Ural (inhabited locality)
Oral, Kazakhstan